Pigs is a 2007 Canadian teen comedy directed by Karl DiPelino. The title refers to the slang meaning of the word pig, an egoist; someone who disregards others' feelings and acts out of self-interest.

Plot
Ladies' man and soon-to-be college graduate Miles is a player who keeps journals to record his "conquests." His friend Cleaver thinks Miles should accept a bet: can Miles sleep with enough girls before he graduates, to complete the alphabet (using the first letter in the girls' surnames)? Having already conquered a number of girls with different first letters in their surnames, Miles stands a good chance of being able to succeed. It all boils down to whether he can find and sleep with a girl whose surname starts with an X. Miles' roommate Ben, however will prove to be a problem for Miles, since he has a crush on Gabrielle, Miles' target.
At the end of the bet, Cleaver tries to push Miles even harder, since the pot has grown to 30,000 dollars. Miles, however, has fallen for Gabrielle, who is different from every girl he's ever met. They start dating, and Ben becomes more jealous. Ben decides to ruin Miles' chances of sleeping with Gabrielle by telling Gabrielle about the bet, even though Miles has clearly explained that Gabrielle means more to him than the money.

Cast
Jefferson Brown .... Miles
Darryn Lucio .... Cleaver
Melanie Marden .... Gabrielle "X"
Christopher Elliott .... Ben
Kelly Cunningham .... Wendy "P"
Katharine Jane Reid .... Fran
Tyrone Greenidge .... Big Eddie
Derek Cvitkovic .... Silvio
Ted Neal .... Tommy
Heidi Rayden .... Michelle Noonan
Leslie Ferreira .... Stacy Usher/Swanson
Sarah Scheffer .... Vicky
Subeena Ishaq .... Rebecca Stinson
Kim Allan .... Party Girl
Yo Mustafa .... Waiter
Chris Traps .... Struggler on Cutting Room Floor

External links

2007 films
Canadian sex comedy films
English-language Canadian films
2000s sex comedy films
2007 comedy films
2000s English-language films
2000s Canadian films